Sharkawshchyna or Sharkovshchina is a town in Vitebsk Region, Belarus, and the administrative center of Sharkawshchyna District. It has a population of 6,900 (2010).

History
Within the Grand Duchy of Lithuania, Sharkawshchyna was part of Vilnius Voivodeship. In 1793, the town was acquired by the Russian Empire as a result of the Second Partition of Poland.

From 1921 until 1939, Sharkawshchyna was part of the Second Polish Republic. In September 1939, Sharkawshchyna was occupied by the Red Army and, on 14 November 1939, incorporated into the Byelorussian SSR. 

From 30 June 1941 until 1 July 1944, Sharkawshchyna was occupied by Nazi Germany and administered as a part of the Generalbezirk Weißruthenien of Reichskommissariat Ostland. In October 1941, 1,900 Jews of the town and surroundings were kept imprisoned in a ghetto. Many died of disease and starvation.
On July 17, 1942, 1200 Jews were murdered in a mass execution perpetrated by an einsatzgruppen, some managed to escape when the Judenrat instructed them to run through the lines of the police coming at them. Several days later, most of the survivors, even though they knew their ultimate fate, joined the Jews of the nearby ghetto at Glebokie. This was used by several Holocaust researchers from the "Israel school" of holocaust research, as a study case showing the futility of Jewish resistance in those years.

References

External links
 

Disnensky Uyezd
Holocaust locations in Belarus
Jewish Belarusian history
Populated places in Vitebsk Region
Sharkawshchyna District
Urban-type settlements in Belarus
Vilnius Voivodeship
Wilno Voivodeship (1926–1939)